Diesel exhaust is the gaseous exhaust produced by a diesel type of internal combustion engine, plus any contained particulates. Its composition may vary with the fuel type or rate of consumption, or speed of engine operation (e.g., idling or at speed or under load), and whether the engine is in an on-road vehicle, farm vehicle, locomotive, marine vessel, or stationary generator or other application.

Diesel exhaust is a Group 1 carcinogen, which causes lung cancer and has a positive association with bladder cancer. It contains several substances that are also listed individually as human carcinogens by the IARC.

Methods exist to reduce nitrogen oxides (NOx) and particulate matter (PM) in the exhaust. So, while diesel fuel contains slightly more carbon (2.68 kg CO₂/litre) than petrol (2.31 kg CO₂/litre), overall CO₂ emissions of a diesel car tend to be lower due to higher efficiency. In use, on average, this equates to around 200 g CO₂/km for petrol and 120 g CO₂/km for diesel.

Composition

The primary products of petroleum fuel combustion in air are carbon dioxide, water, and nitrogen. The other components exist primarily from incomplete combustion and pyrosynthesis.
While the distribution of the individual components of raw (untreated) diesel exhaust varies depending on factors like load, engine type, etc., the adjacent table shows a typical composition.

The physical and chemical conditions that exist inside any such diesel engines under any conditions differ considerably from spark-ignition engines, because, by design, diesel engine power is directly controlled by the fuel supply, not by control of the air/fuel mixture, as in conventional gasoline engines. As a result of these differences, diesel engines generally produce a different array of pollutants than spark-driven engines, differences that are sometimes qualitative (what pollutants are there, and what are not), but more often quantitative (how much of particular pollutants or pollutant classes are present in each). For instance, diesel engines produce one-twenty-eighth the carbon monoxide that gasoline engines do, as they burn their fuel in excess air even at full load.

However, the lean-burning nature of diesel engines and the high temperatures and pressures of the combustion process result in significant production of NOx (gaseous nitrogen oxides), an air pollutant that constitutes a unique challenge with regard to their reduction. While total nitrogen oxides from petrol cars have decreased by around 96% through adoption of exhaust catalytic converters as of 2012, diesel cars still produce nitrogen oxides at a similar level to those bought 15 years earlier under real-world tests; hence, diesel cars emit around 20 times more nitrogen oxides than petrol cars. Modern on-road diesel engines typically use selective catalytic reduction (SCR) systems to meet emissions laws, as other methods such as exhaust gas recirculation (EGR) cannot adequately reduce NOx to meet the newer standards applicable in many jurisdictions. Auxiliary diesel systems designed to remediate the nitrogen oxide pollutants are described in a separate section below.

Moreover, the fine particles (fine particulate matter) in diesel exhaust (e.g., soot, sometimes visible as opaque dark-colored smoke) has traditionally been of greater concern, as it presents different health concerns and is rarely produced in significant quantities by spark-ignition engines. These especially harmful particulate contaminants are at their peak when such engines are run without sufficient oxygen to fully combust the fuel; when a diesel engine runs at idle, enough oxygen is usually present to burn the fuel completely. (The oxygen requirement in non-idling engines is usually satisfied using turbocharging.). From the particle emission standpoint, exhaust from diesel vehicles has been reported to be significantly more harmful than those from petrol vehicles.

Diesel exhausts, long known for their characteristic smells, changed significantly with the reduction of sulfur content of diesel fuel, and again when catalytic converters were introduced in exhaust systems. Even so, diesel exhausts continue to contain an array of inorganic and organic pollutants, in various classes, and in varying concentrations (see below), depending on fuel composition and engine running conditions.

Exhaust gas composition according to various sources

Chemical classes
The following are classes of chemical compounds that have been found in diesel exhaust.

Specific chemicals
The following are classes of specific chemicals that have been found in diesel exhaust.

§Includes all regioisomers of this aromatic compound. See ortho-, meta-, and para-isomer descriptions at each compound's article.

Regulation

To rapidly reduce particulate matter from heavy-duty diesel engines in California, the California Air Resources Board created the Carl Moyer Memorial Air Quality Standards Attainment Program to provide funding for upgrading engines ahead of emissions regulations. In 2008, the California Air Resources Board also implemented the 2008 California Statewide Truck and Bus Rule which requires all heavy-duty diesel trucks and buses, with a few exceptions, that operate in California to either retrofit or replace engines in order to reduce diesel particulate matter. The US Mine Safety and Health Administration (MSHA) issued a health standard in January 2001 designed to reduce diesel exhaust exposure in underground metal and nonmetal mines; on September 7, 2005, MSHA published a notice in the Federal Register proposing to postpone the effective date from January 2006 until January 2011.

Sulfur content:

Unlike international shipping, that has a Sulfur limit at 3.5% mass/mass outside ECA until 2020, where it reduces to 0,5% outside ECA, diesel for on road use and off road (heavy equipment) has been limited in all of EU since 2009.

"Diesel and gasoline have been limited to 10 ppm sulfur since 2009 (for on-road vehicles) and 2011 (non-road vehicles). Mandatory specifications also apply to more than a dozen fuel parameters."

Health concerns

General concerns
Emissions from diesel vehicles have been reported to be significantly more harmful than those from petrol vehicles. Diesel combustion exhaust is a source of atmospheric soot and fine particles, which is a component of the air pollution implicated in human cancer, heart and lung damage, and mental functioning. Moreover, diesel exhaust contains contaminants listed as carcinogenic for humans by the IARC (part of the World Health Organization of the United Nations), as present in their List of IARC Group 1 carcinogens. Diesel exhaust pollution is thought to account for around one quarter of the pollution in the air in previous decades, and a high share of sickness caused by automotive pollution.

Occupational health effects

Exposure to diesel exhaust and diesel particulate matter (DPM) is an occupational hazard to truckers, railroad workers, occupants of residential homes in vicinity of a rail yard, and miners using diesel-powered equipment in underground mines. Adverse health effects have also been observed in the general population at ambient atmospheric particle concentrations well below the concentrations in occupational settings.

In March 2012, U.S. government scientists showed that underground miners exposed to high levels of diesel fumes have a threefold increased risk for contracting lung cancer compared with those exposed to low levels. The $11.5 million Diesel Exhaust in Miners Study (DEMS) followed 12,315 miners, controlling for key carcinogens such as cigarette smoke, radon, and asbestos. This allowed scientists to isolate the effects of diesel fumes.

For over 10 years, concerns have been raised in the USA regarding children's exposure to DPM as they ride diesel-powered school buses to and from school. In 2013, the Environmental Protection Agency (EPA) established the Clean School Bus USA initiative in an effort to unite private and public organizations in curbing student exposures.

Concerns regarding particulates

Diesel particulate matter (DPM), sometimes also called diesel exhaust particles (DEP), is the particulate component of diesel exhaust, which includes diesel soot and aerosols such as ash particulates, metallic abrasion particles, sulfates, and silicates. When released into the atmosphere, DPM can take the form of individual particles or chain aggregates, with most in the invisible sub-micrometre range of 100 nanometers, also known as ultrafine particles (UFP) or PM0.1.

The main particulate fraction of diesel exhaust consists of fine particles. Because of their small size, inhaled particles may easily penetrate deep into the lungs. The polycyclic aromatic hydrocarbons (PAHs) in the exhaust stimulate nerves in the lungs, causing reflex coughing, wheezing and shortness of breath. The rough surfaces of these particles makes it easy for them to bind with other toxins in the environment, thus increasing the hazards of particle inhalation.

A study of particulate matter (PM) emissions from transit buses running on ULSD and a mixture of biodiesel and conventional diesel (B20) was reported by Omidvarborna and coworkers, where they conclude PM emissions appeared lower in cases of mixed diesel/biodiesel use, where they were dependent on the engine model, cold and hot idle modes, and fuel type, and that heavy metals in PM emitted during hot idling were greater than those from cold idling; reasons for PM reduction in biodiesel emissions were suggested to result from the oxygenated structure of biodiesel fuel, as well as arising from changes in technology (including the use of a catalytic converter in this test system). Other studies concluded that while in certain specific cases (i.e. low loads, more saturated feedstocks, ...), NOx emissions can be lower than with diesel fuel, in most cases NOx emissions are higher, and the NOx emissions even go up as more biofuel is mixed in. Pure biodiesel (B100) even ends up having 10-30% more NOx emissions compared to regular diesel fuel.

Specific effects
Exposures have been linked with acute short-term symptoms such as headache, dizziness, light-headedness, nausea, coughing, difficult or labored breathing, tightness of chest, and irritation of the eyes, nose, and throat. Long-term exposures can lead to chronic, more serious health problems such as cardiovascular disease, cardiopulmonary disease, and lung cancer.
Elemental carbon attributable to traffic was significantly associated with wheezing at age 1 and persistent wheezing at age 3 in the Cincinnati Childhood Allergy and Air Pollution Study birth cohort study.

The NERC-HPA funded Traffic Pollution and Health in London project at King's College London is currently seeking to refine understanding of the health effects of traffic pollution. Ambient traffic-related air pollution was associated with decreased cognitive function in older men.

Mortality from diesel soot exposure in 2001 was at least 14,400 out of the German population of 82 million, according to the official report 2352 of the Umweltbundesamt Berlin (Federal Environmental Agency of Germany).

The study of nanoparticles and nanotoxicology is in its infancy, and health effects from nanoparticles produced by all types of diesel engines are still being uncovered. It is clear, that diesel health detriments of fine particle emissions are severe and pervasive. Although one study found no significant evidence that short-term exposure to diesel exhaust results in adverse extrapulmonary effects, effects that are correlated with an increase in cardiovascular disease, a 2011 study in The Lancet concluded that traffic exposure is the single most serious preventable trigger of heart attack in the general public, as the cause of 7.4% of all attacks. It is impossible to tell how much of this effect is due to the stress of being in traffic and how much is due to exposure to exhaust.

Since the study of the detrimental health effects of nanoparticles (nanotoxicology) is still in its infancy, and the nature and extent of negative health impacts from diesel exhaust continues to be discovered, it remains controversial whether the public health impact of diesels is higher than that of petrol-fuelled vehicles.

Variation with engine conditions

The types and quantities of nanoparticles can vary according to operating temperatures and pressures, presence of an open flame, fundamental fuel type and fuel mixture, and even atmospheric mixtures. As such, the resulting types of nanoparticles from different engine technologies and even different fuels are not necessarily comparable. One study has shown that 95% of the volatile component of diesel nanoparticles is unburned lubricating oil. Long-term effects still need to be further clarified, as well as the effects on susceptible groups of people with cardiopulmonary diseases.

Diesel engines can produce black soot (or more specifically diesel particulate matter) from their exhaust. The black smoke consists of carbon compounds that have not burned because of local low temperatures where the fuel is not fully atomized. These local low temperatures occur at the cylinder walls, and at the surface of large droplets of fuel. At these areas where it is relatively cold, the mixture is rich (contrary to the overall mixture which is lean). The rich mixture has less air to burn and some of the fuel turns into a carbon deposit. Modern car engines use a diesel particulate filter (DPF) to capture carbon particles and then intermittently burn them using extra fuel injected directly into the filter. This prevents carbon buildup at the expense of wasting a small quantity of fuel.

The full load limit of a diesel engine in normal service is defined by the "black smoke limit", beyond which point the fuel cannot be completely burned. As the "black smoke limit" is still considerably lean of stoichiometric, it is possible to obtain more power by exceeding it, but the resultant inefficient combustion means that the extra power comes at the price of reduced combustion efficiency, high fuel consumption and dense clouds of smoke. This is only done in high performance applications where these disadvantages are of little concern.

When starting from cold, the engine's combustion efficiency is reduced because the cold engine block draws heat out of the cylinder in the compression stroke. The result is that fuel is not burned fully, resulting in blue and white smoke and lower power outputs until the engine has warmed. This is especially the case with indirect injection engines, which are less thermally efficient. With electronic injection, the timing and length of the injection sequence can be altered to compensate for this. Older engines with mechanical injection can have mechanical and hydraulic governor control to alter the timing, and multi-phase electrically controlled glow plugs, that stay on for a period after start-up to ensure clean combustion; the plugs are automatically switched to a lower power to prevent their burning out.

Wärtsilä states that there are two ways of forming smoke, on large diesel engines, one being fuel hitting metal and not having time to burn off. The other being, when too much fuel is in the combustion chamber.

Wärtsilä have tested an engine and compared smoke-output, when using conventional fuel system and common rail fuel system, the result shows improvement on all operation conditions when using the common rail system.

Ecological effects

Experiments in 2013 showed that diesel exhaust impaired bees' ability to detect the scent of oilseed rape flowers.

Remedies

General
With emission standards tightening, diesel engines are having to become more efficient and have fewer pollutants in their exhaust. For instance, light duty truck must now have NOx emissions less than 0.07 g/mile, and in the U.S., by 2010, NOx emissions must be less than 0.03 g/mile. Moreover, in recent years the United States, Europe, and Japan have extended emissions control regulations from covering on-road vehicles to include farm vehicles and locomotives, marine vessels, and stationary generator applications. Changing to a different fuel (i.e. dimethyl ether, and other bioethers as diethyl ether ) tends to be a very effective means to reduce pollutants such as NOx and CO. When running on dimethyl ether (DME) for instance, particulate matter emissions are near-nonexistent, and the use of diesel particulate filters could even be omitted. Also, given that DME can be made from animal, food, and agricultural waste, it can even be carbon-neutral (unlike regular diesel). Mixing in bioether (or other fuels such as hydrogen) into conventional diesel also tends to have a beneficial effect on the pollutants that are emitted.
In addition to changing the fuel, US engineers have also come up with two other principles and distinct systems to all on-market products that meet the U.S. 2010 emissions criteria, selective non-catalytic reduction (SNCR), and exhaust gas recirculation (EGR). Both are in the exhaust system of diesel engines, and are further designed to promote efficiency.

Selective catalytic reduction
Selective catalytic reduction (SCR) injects a reductant such as ammonia or urea — the latter aqueous, where it is known as diesel exhaust fluid, DEF) — into the exhaust of a diesel engine to convert nitrogen oxides (NOx) into gaseous nitrogen and water. SNCR systems have been prototyped that reduce 90% of the NOx in the exhaust system, with commercialized systems being somewhat lower. SCR systems do not necessarily need particulate matter (PM) filters; when SNCR and PM filters are combined, some engines have been shown to be 3-5% more fuel efficient. A disadvantage of the SCR system, in addition to added upfront development cost (which can be offset by compliance and improved performance), is the need to refill the reductant, the periodicity of which varies with the miles driven, load factors, and the hours used.  The SNCR system is not as efficient at higher revolutions per minute (rpm). SCR is being optimized to have higher efficiency with broader temperatures, to be more durable, and to meet other commercial needs.

Exhaust gas recirculation

Exhaust gas recirculation (EGR), on diesel engines, can be used to achieve a richer fuel to air mixture and a lower peak combustion temperature. Both effects reduce NOx emissions, but can negatively impact efficiency and the production of soot particles. The richer mix is achieved by displacing some of the intake air, but is still lean compared to petrol engines, which approach the stoichiometric ideal. The lower peak temperature is achieved by a heat exchanger that removes heat before re-entering the engine, and works due to the exhaust gases' higher specific heat capacity than air. With the greater soot production, EGR is often combined with a particulate matter (PM) filter in the exhaust. In turbocharged engines, EGR needs a controlled pressure differential across the exhaust manifold and intake manifold, which can be met by such engineering as use of a variable geometry turbocharger, which has inlet guide vanes on the turbine to build exhaust backpressure in the exhaust manifold directing exhaust gas to the intake manifold. It also requires additional external piping and valving, and so requires additional maintenance.

Combined systems
John Deere, the farm equipment manufacturer, is implementing such a combined SCR-EGR design, in a 9-liter "inline 6" diesel engine that involves both system types, a PM filter and additional oxidation catalyst technologies. The combined system incorporates two turbochargers, the first on the exhaust manifold, with variable geometry and containing the EGR system; and a second a fixed geometry turbocharger. Recirculated exhaust gas and the compressed air from the turbochargers have separate coolers, and air merges before entering the intake manifold, and all subsystems are controlled by a central engine control unit that optimizes minimization of pollutants released in the exhaust gas.

Other remedies
A new technology being tested in 2016 has been created by Air Ink which collects carbon particles using a "Kaalink" cylindrical device that is retrofitted into a vehicle's exhaust system, after processing to remove heavy metals and carcinogens, the company plans to use the carbon to make ink.

Water recovery
There has been research into ways that troops in deserts can recover drinkable water from their vehicles' exhaust gases.

See also
Carl Moyer Memorial Air Quality Standards Attainment Program
List of IARC Group 1 carcinogens
List of IARC Group 2A carcinogens
List of IARC Group 2B carcinogens
List of IARC Group 3 possible carcinogens
National Emissions Standards for Hazardous Air Pollutants
Rolling coal - intentional creation of conspicuous excessive diesel exhaust
Vehicle emissions control
Volkswagen emissions scandal

References and notes

Further reading
Department of Labor, Mine Safety and Health Administration. Diesel Particulate Matter Exposure of Underground Metal and Nonmetal Miners: Final Rule, January 19, 2001. Federal Register 66(13):5706.

Wichmann, H.-E. Abschaetzung positiver gesundheitlicher Auswirkungen durch den Einsatz von Partikelfiltern bei Dieselfahrzeugen in Deutschland Umweltbundesamt Berlin 2003. Report 2352, especially page 32.
Umweltbundesamt Berlin Future Diesel. Abgasgesetzgebung Pkw, leichte Nfz und Lkw – Fortschreibung der Grenzwerte bei Dieselfahrzeugen 2003. Report 2353, especially page 25.

External links
Diesel Information Hub , AECC
Emission of different pollutants from diesel engines, EnggStudy
NIOSH Mining Safety and Health Topic: Diesel Exhaust
Diesel Particulate Matter, a case study at www.defendingscience.org
Clean School Bus USA, EPA Initiative
Weight of the Evidence or Wait for the Evidence? Protecting Underground Miners from Diesel Particulate Matter Article by Celeste Monforton. American Journal of Public Health, February 2006.
Diesel exhaust – peer-reviewed studies by Health Effects Institute
Safety and Health Topics: Diesel Exhaust, U.S. Department of Labor Occupational Safety & Health Administration
Safety and Health Topics: Diesel Exhaust - Partial List of Chemicals Associated with Diesel Exhaust, U.S. Department of Labor Occupational Safety & Health Administration
Diesel Exhaust Particulates: Reasonably Anticipated to Be A Human Carcinogen
Impact of Fuel Metal Impurities on the Durability of a Light-Duty Diesel Aftertreatment System National Renewable Energy Laboratory
Acute Inflammatory Responses in the Airways and Peripheral Blood After Short-Term Exposure to Diesel Exhaust in Healthy Human Volunteers, American Journal of Respiratory and Critical Care Medicine
Diesel exhaust: what you need to know
Health Effects of Diesel Exhaust  - fact sheet by Cal/EPA and American Lung Association

Air pollution
Air pollution control systems
Diesel engines
History of the diesel engine